Bavaria-Ingolstadt ( or ) was a duchy which was part of the Holy Roman Empire from 1392 to 1447.

History
After the death of Stephen II in 1375, his sons Stephen III, Frederick, and John II jointly ruled Bavaria-Landshut. After seventeen years, the brothers decided to formally divide their inheritance. John received Bavaria-Munich, Stephen  received Bavaria-Ingolstadt, while Frederick kept what remained of Bavaria-Landshut.

After Stephen's death in 1413, Louis VII assumed his father's throne. In 1429 parts of Bavaria-Straubing were united with Bavaria-Ingolstadt. Louis reigned until his own son, Louis VIII, usurped his throne in 1443 and delivered him to their enemy, Henry XVI, duke of Bavaria-Landshut. Louis VIII died two years later. Louis VII died in captivity. With no heir, Bavaria-Ingolstadt was returned to Bavaria-Landshut.

Geography
Bavaria-Ingolstadt was cobbled together from diverse, non-contiguous territories in Bavaria. The capital was Ingolstadt and included the territories around it:  Schrobenhausen, Aichach, Friedberg, Rain am Lech and Höchstädt an der Donau. In addition, Bavaria Ingolstadt incorporated the following towns:

Southern Bavaria:
Wasserburg am Inn
Ebersberg
Kufstein
Kitzbühel
Rattenberg

Eastern Bavaria:
Schärding
Dingolfing
Mallersdorf and Pfaffenberg

Northern Bavaria:
Hilpoltstein
Hersbruck
Lauf an der Pegnitz
Weiden in der Oberpfalz
Waldmünchen

References 

1447 disestablishments
States and territories established in 1392
Former states and territories of Bavaria
Ingolstadt
Duchy of Bavaria
Duchies of the Holy Roman Empire